College of the North Atlantic (CNA, formerly CONA) is one of the largest post-secondary educational and skills training centres in Atlantic Canada, with a history dating back 50 years. The college has 17 campus locations throughout the province of Newfoundland and Labrador in Canada, various partner universities in China and formerly operated a technical education college for the State of Qatar in the Middle East. The enabling legislation is the
College Act.

The headquarters for College of the North Atlantic and the Bay St. George campus are located in Stephenville, on the west coast of the island of Newfoundland. College of the North Atlantic offers nearly 100 full-time program offerings and more than 300 part-time courses for some 25,000 students each year.

History
1963	

District Vocational Schools (DVS) open around the province. Over the next few years DVS open in:
 Labrador City
 Happy Valley-Goose Bay
 St. Anthony
 Corner Brook
 Stephenville Crossing
 Port aux Basques
 Baie Verte
 Springdale
 Grand Falls - Windsor
 Lewisporte
 Gander
 Bonavista
 Clarenville
 Burin
 Placentia
 Carbonear
 Seal Cove

College of Trades and Technology opens in St. John's.
Heavy Equipment School opens in Stephenville.

1967
	
Adult Upgrading Centre opens in Stephenville.

1977
	
Bay St. George Community College established in Stephenville encompassing the District Vocational School in Stephenville Crossing, the Adult Upgrading Centre and the Heavy Equipment School.

1987
	
Two Institutes and five Community Colleges are formed from the former District Vocational Schools, the College of Trades and Technology and the Bay St. George Community College. These Colleges are:
 Cabot Institute 
 Fisher Technical College
 Avalon Community College
 Eastern Community College
 Central Newfoundland Community College
 Labrador Community College
 Western Community College

1991
	
The Fisher Technical College is renamed the Fisher Institute of Applied Arts and Technology.
Western Community College is renamed Western College of Applied Arts and Technology.

1992
	
Five Colleges of Applied Arts and Technology and Continuing Education are formed from the two Institutes and five Community Colleges. 
These Colleges are:
 Cabot College
 Eastern College
 Central Newfoundland Community College
 Westviking College
 Labrador College

1997
	
College of the North Atlantic is formed from the five previous Colleges.

Campuses
College of the North Atlantic has 17 campus locations throughout Newfoundland and Labrador. In 2022, CNA divested itself of the Qatar campus.
In alphabetical order, CNA campus locations are in the following locations:

Facilities
The Bay St. George campus consists of five main buildings. These buildings include a residence with a capacity of 170 students and dining facilities.

See also
 Higher education in Newfoundland and Labrador
 List of universities in Newfoundland and Labrador
 Canadian Interuniversity Sport
 Canadian government scientific research organizations
 Canadian university scientific research organizations
 Canadian industrial research and development organizations

References

External links
 
College of North Atlantic-Qatar official website

Universities and colleges in Newfoundland and Labrador
Stephenville, Newfoundland and Labrador
Canada–Qatar relations
Educational institutions established in 1997
1997 establishments in Newfoundland and Labrador